Orthocomotis andina is a species of moth of the family Tortricidae. It is found in Ecuador (Napo Province, Morona-Santiago Province, Carchi Province, Sucumbíos Province).

The wingspan is 26–28 mm. The ground colour of the forewings is whitish, suffused with grey and scaled with green in the tornal area. The hindwings are brown.

Etymology
The species name refers to the distribution of the species in the Andes.

References

Moths described in 2007
Orthocomotis